This is a list of electoral results for the electoral district of Moorabbin in Victorian state elections.

Members for Moorabbin

Election results

Elections in the 1970s

Elections in the 1960s

Elections in the 1950s

References

Victoria (Australia) state electoral results by district